Theodor Christoph Heinrich Rehbock (12 April 1864, Amsterdam – 17 August 1950, Baden-Baden) was a German hydraulics engineer, and professor at the University of Karlsruhe.

Theodor Rehbock's father was an overseas merchant. Rehbock studied at the Technical University Munich and Berlin Institute of Technology during 1884–90, receiving his MSc degree in 1892.

Rehbock performed studies on water supply and hydraulic engineering in many countries. Further, he built a hydroelectric power station in the Murg river in Baden. In 1899, Rehbock became professor of hydraulics at the University of Karlsruhe. Where he started a hydraulics laboratory, in 1901, of which he was the director until 1934. The hydraulics aspects of most large projects in Germany – as well as in many other countries in the world – were tested here. For instance the Afsluitdijk for the separation of the Zuiderzee (Dutch for South Sea) from the Wadden Sea in the Netherlands. After his retirement, the laboratory has been named the "Theodor Rehbock Laboratory".

Rehbock was rector (university president) of the University of Karlsruhe three times: in 1907–08, 1917–18 and 1925–26.

In 1935, an initiative of Theodor Rehbock, Wolmar Fellenius and Rudolf Seifert lead to the establishment of the International Association for Hydro-Environment Engineering and Research (IAHR).

In 1901 Rehbock married Margarete Küster. She gave birth to four sons and one daughter.

Honours 
 Rehbock weir – a device to accurately measure the discharge in open channel flows.
 Rehbock dentated sill – for kinetic energy dissipation at the end of a stilling basin, into which the spillway of a large dam ends. This, in order to prevent or reduce scour.
 Theodor Rehbock Medal – of the Deutsche Vereinigung für Wasserwirtschaft, Abwasser und Abfall (DWA; German Association for Water, Wastewater and Waste), to honour members who made outstanding innovations within the fields covered by the association. This award has been established in 2007.
 Honorary doctorates from the Technical University Munich and the Palatine Joseph University of Technology and Economics in Budapest.
 Honorary member of the Dutch Royal Institution of Engineers (KIvI) in The Hague.
 A street in Karlsruhe has been named after him.

Notes

References

External links 
 "Institut für Wasser und Gewässerentwicklung, Bereich Wasserwirtschaft und Kulturtechnik" with the Theodor Rehbock Wasserbaulaboratorium (Theodor Rehbock Hydraulics Laboratory) at the University of Karlsruhe 
 

Fluid dynamicists
Engineers from Amsterdam
Engineers from Karlsruhe
Technical University of Munich alumni
1864 births
1950 deaths